is a railway station in Itoda, Fukuoka Prefecture, Japan. It is on the Itoda Line, operated by the Heisei Chikuhō Railway. Trains arrive roughly every hour.

On 1 April 2009, discount shop chain MrMax acquired naming rights to the station.

External links
Buzen-Ōkuma Station (Heisei Chikuhō Railway website)

References

Railway stations in Fukuoka Prefecture
Railway stations in Japan opened in 1942
Heisei Chikuhō Railway Itoda Line